Hernán de Jesús Orantes López (born 11 April 1968) is a Mexican politician from the Institutional Revolutionary Party (PRI). He serves as a deputy of the LXIII Legislature of the Mexican Congress representing the second federal electoral district of Chiapas.

Career
In 1992, Orantes López graduated with a bachelor's degree in electrical engineering from the Centro de Estudios Universitarios (Center for University Studies). In 1993 and 1994, he worked in his first public service job, as a management coordinator for Infonavit. From 1998 to 2001, he served as an advisor to the government of the town of Ixhuatán; after performing in that capacity, he went on to several PRI posts, most notably as a municipal territorial coordinator from 2002 to 2004. He also joined agricultural associations: in 1999, he became an active member of the Mexican Association of Breeders of Registered Swiss Cattle, and three years later, he became an active member of the Chiapas Association of Purebred Breeders.

In 2005, Orantes López graduated from the Universidad Valle de Grijalva with an undergraduate law degree; that same year, he was elected municipal president of Tapilula, Chiapas, where he served two years. During 2006, he also served as a regional liaison in the PRI.

Voters once again elected Orantes López in 2009, this time to the Chamber of Deputies for the LXI Legislature. He was the secretary of the Rural Development Commission and also sat on the Agrarian Reform, Indigenous Matters, and Special for the Grijalva-Usumacinta River Valley Commissions.

After his first term in San Lázaro, he got involved in business activities with Empresas y Servicios del Norte de Chiapas ORLO, S.A. de C.V., a Pemex franchisee, and served as a delegate of the Comisión Nacional para el Desarrollo de los Pueblos Indígenas in the state.

Three years after his first term ended, Orantes López returned to the Chamber of Deputies in 2015, serving in the LXIII Legislature. He is the secretary of the Indigenous Matters and Ranching Commissions, and he also serves on the Population Committee. He is the head of the PRI's delegation of deputies from the state of Chiapas.

Personal
Hernán's sister, María Elena Orantes López, is also a legislator, currently serving in the LXIII Legislature and representing Movimiento Ciudadano.

References

1968 births
Living people
Politicians from Chiapas
Members of the Chamber of Deputies (Mexico) for Chiapas
Institutional Revolutionary Party politicians
21st-century Mexican politicians
Municipal presidents in Chiapas
Deputies of the LXIII Legislature of Mexico